Forner is a surname. Notable people with the surname include:

Juan Bautista Pablo Forner, (1756–1799), Spanish satirist and scholar, called to the bar at Madrid in 1783
Lola Forner (born 1960), Spanish film actress, chosen Miss Spain in 1979
Raquel Forner (1902–1988), Argentine painter known for her expressionist works
Sandro Forner (born 1970), Brazilian football coach and former player